Sport Relief 2016 is a fundraising event organised by Sport Relief. A number of run-up events took place and the main event consisted of a live telethon broadcast on BBC One and BBC Two from the evening of Friday 18 March 2016 to early the following morning. Due to the closure of BBC Television Centre, the live studio event is now broadcast from the Queen Elizabeth Olympic Park in London.

Main event
The live telethon was broadcast on BBC One and BBC Two from the evening of Friday 18 March 2016  to early the following morning along with a number of run-up events and was presented by Gary Lineker, Davina McCall, David Walliams, Claudia Winkleman, John Bishop, Greg James, and Alesha Dixon.

Presenters

Appeal Film Presenters
Stars including Danny Dyer, Clare Balding, Olivia Colman, Rochelle Humes and Marvin Humes presented appeal films.

Official single
James Bay has recorded the official Sport Relief Single for 2016, a new version of his single "Running" recorded at the Abbey Studios in London.

Sketches and Features

Musical Performances

Within Other Shows
TV programmes that led up to the main event included:
 The Great Comic Relief Bake Off
 Jo Brand's Hell of a Walk for Sport Relief
 Famous, Rich and Homeless
 Let's Play Darts for Sport Relief
 Pointless Celebrities
 The Sport Relief Games Show
 Hell on High Seas
 Eddie Izzard Marathon Man

Donation progress

References

2016 in British sport
2016 in British television
Comic Relief
2016
March 2016 events in the United Kingdom